The men's artistic gymnastics parallel bars competition at the 2015 European Games was held at the National Gymnastics Arena on 20 June 2015.

Qualification

The top six gymnasts with one per country advanced to the final.

Final

References 

Men's parallel bars